In neuroanatomy, the arcuate fasciculus (AF) is a bundle of axons that generally connects the Broca's area and the Wernicke's area in the brain. It is an association fiber tract connecting caudal temporal cortex and inferior frontal lobe.

Structure
The arcuate fasciculus is a white matter tract that runs parallel to the superior longitudinal fasciculus. Due to their proximity, some researchers refer to them interchangeably. They can be distinguished by the location and function of their endpoints in the frontal cortex. The arcuate fasciculus terminates in Broca's area (specifically BA 44) which is linked to processing complex syntax. However, the superior longitudinal fasciculus ends in the premotor cortex which is implicated in acoustic-motor mapping.

Connection 
Historically, the arcuate fasciculus has been understood to connect two important areas for language use: Broca's area in the inferior frontal gyrus and Wernicke's area in the posterior superior temporal gyrus. The majority of scientists consider this to be an oversimplification; however, this model is still utilized because a satisfactory replacement has not been developed. The topographical relationships between independent measures of white matter and gray matter integrity suggest that rich developmental or environmental interactions influence brain structure and function. The presence and strength of such associations may elucidate pathophysiological processes influencing systems such as language and motor planning.

As the technique of diffusion MRI has improved, this has become a testable hypothesis. Research indicates more diffuse termination of the fibers of the arcuate than previously thought. While the main caudal source of the fiber tract appears to be posterior superior temporal cortex, the rostral terminations are mostly in premotor cortex, part of Brodmann area 44.

Developmental Differences 
Myelination is a process by which axons are covered with a protective substance called myelin that drastically increases the signaling efficiency of the neuron. The arcuate fasciculus is heavily myelinated in healthy adult brains. The density of this myelination has been found to predict the accuracy and speed to which one can comprehend sentences. However, the arcuate fasciculus of newborns is unmyelinated. The myelination process occurs gradually during childhood; myelin density has been shown to increase between the age of 3 and 10. A study comparing a group of 6-year-olds to a group of 3-year-olds found that the 6-year-olds had stronger functional connectivity of the arcuate fasciculus. The arcuate fasciculus is similarly undeveloped in non-human primates such as chimpanzees and macaques. This supports the theory that the arcuate fasciculus is a critical component in language.

Dorsal Stream 
The Dual-Stream model of language proposes that there are two streams by which the brain processes language information: the dorsal and ventral streams. The basis of this model is generally accepted, however the details of it are highly contentious. The dorsal pathway consists of multiple fiber tracts, one of which is the arcuate fasciculus. The dorsal pathway as a whole is implicated in sensory-to-motor mapping and processing complex syntax.

Role in Language

Syntax 
Syntax refers to a set of rules by which we order words within a language. Some researchers argue that syntax is what distinguishes language as a uniquely human capacity. Though the exact function of the arcuate fasciculus is still debated, the predominant theory is that it is involved with processing complex sequences of syntax. Studies indicate that as the arcuate fasciculus matures and undergoes myelination, there is a corresponding increase in the ability to process syntax. Furthermore, lesions in the arcuate fasciculus often result in difficulties with syntax. Researchers have found that when subjects are confronted with difficult syntactic structures, there is high synchronicity between the left frontal and parietal regions due to their connection by the arcuate fasciculus. This research further supports the arcuate fasciculus as the key component of human language.

Lateralization 
The arcuate fasciculus is a bilateral structure; this means that it is present in both the right and left hemispheres of the brain. These fiber tracts are asymmetrical; the left arcuate fasciculus is stronger than the right. While the left arcuate fasciculus is thought to be the one involved with syntax processing, the right arcuate fasciculus has been implicated in prosody processing. Studies further suggest that the right arcuate fasciculus is involved with the ability to read emotion from human facial expression.

Clinical significance

Conduction aphasia 
Historically the arcuate fasciculus has been linked to conduction aphasia, which is usually the result of damage to the inferior parietal lobule that extends into the subcortical white matter and compromises the arcuate fasciculus. This type of aphasia is characterized by difficulty with repetition and prevalent phonemic paraphasias. Patients otherwise exhibit a relatively normal control of language. The symptoms of conduction aphasia suggest that the connection between the posterior temporal cortex and frontal cortex plays a vital role in short-term memory of words and speech sounds that are new or have just been heard. The arcuate fasciculus is the main connection between these two regions. Studies that challenge the claim that the arcuate fasciculus is responsible for repetition cite that in some cases lesions to the arcuate fasciculus nor total agenesis produce conduction aphasia.

Progressive aphasia 
Progressive aphasia is a type of aphasia that slowly worsens over time. It can affect both the production and comprehension of language. Progressive aphasic patients that have lesions in their arcuate fasciculus were especially deficient in their syntax processing abilities. Worsened syntax processing correlated with the degree of degradation in the arcuate fasciculus.

Tone deafness 
In nine out of ten people with tone deafness, the superior arcuate fasciculus in the right hemisphere could not be detected, suggesting a disconnection between the posterior superior temporal gyrus and the posterior inferior frontal gyrus. Researchers suggested the posterior superior temporal gyrus was the origin of the disorder.

Stuttering 
In stutterers, the arcuate fasciculus appears to have bilateral deficits that reduce it by one-third or more relative to non-stutterers. However, there is ongoing debate concerning the contribution of each hemisphere. Diffusion-based evidence of differences between stutterers and controls is not isolated to the arcuate fasciculus.

Specific Language Impairment 
Specific language impairment is a disorder that prevents children from developing language normally. These children particularly have difficulty with the syntactic and hierarchal structures of language. Damage to the arcuate fasciculus is implicated as a possible cause of specific language impairment, however further data is required to validate this claim.

Dyslexia 
Dyslexia is a disorder that is primarily characterized by reading deficits. Research has shown that decreases in the integrity of the arcuate fasciculus coincide with worsened reading ability in dyslexic subjects.

See also
 Aphasia
 Wernicke–Geschwind model

References

External links

 https://web.archive.org/web/20070528184714/http://www.lib.mcg.edu/edu/eshuphysio/program/section8/8ch15/s8c15_14.htm
 http://thebrain.mcgill.ca/flash/d/d_10/d_10_cr/d_10_cr_lan/d_10_cr_lan.html
 

Cerebral white matter
Central nervous system pathways